Kimi Ora School Wellington is a special needs school in Wellington, New Zealand, for students with disabilities. Kimi ora is Maori for "seeking well-being in health" or  "to be made whole".

Kimi Ora school caters for special needs pupils of primary and secondary school age to adulthood, or ages 5 to 21, and draws pupils from the Wellington region, up to the Kapiti Coast and the Hutt Valley.

The school offers an holistic approach to education. Speech language therapy, occupational therapy and physiotherapy are offered on site, on an ongoing basis, and add an extra dimension to each student's education.

The school had been located in Thorndon for nearly 60 years before it was decided to leave the area allowing it to increase its roll. The move allowed Kimi Ora to increase its roll from 35 to 40 students (22 at Naenae and 18 at Evans Bay).

In the beginning of 2011 the new Kimi Ora Base School was opened next to the existing intermediate schools in Naenae (Lower Hutt) and a satellite unit in Evans Bay (Kilbirnie). The Base School has been awarded by the New Zealand Green Building Council with a 5 Star Green Star NZ - Education 2009 Certified Rating.

References

Special schools in New Zealand
Schools in Wellington City
Schools in Lower Hutt